The following is a list of awards and nominations received by Jay-Z, an American recording artist and businessman.

ADC Awards

|-
|rowspan="1" style="text-align:center;"| 2018
|rowspan="1"| "The Story of O.J."
| Craft in Motion: Animation
|

African-American Film Critics Association Awards

|-
|rowspan="1" style="text-align:center;"| 2022
|rowspan="1"| "Guns Go Bang"
| Best Music
|

Aice Awards

|-
|rowspan="1" style="text-align:center;"| 2014
|rowspan="1"| "Picasso Baby"
|rowspan="2"| Music Video
| 
|-
|rowspan="2" style="text-align:center;"| 2018
|rowspan="2"| "The Story of O.J."
| 
|-
|rowspan="2"| Motion Design and Graphics
| 
|-

AICP Post Award

American Music Awards
The American Music Awards are held annually by the American Broadcasting Company. Jay-Z has won three awards from seven nominations.

|-
| style="text-align:center;"| 2000
|rowspan="2"| Jay-Z
|rowspan="2"| Favorite Rap/Hip Hop Artist
| 
|-
| style="text-align:center;" rowspan="2"| 2004
| 
|-
| The Black Album
|rowspan="2"| Favorite Rap/Hip Hop Album
| 
|-
| style="text-align:center;"| 2008
| American Gangster
| 
|-
| style="text-align:center;" rowspan="2"| 2009
| Jay-Z
| Favorite Rap/Hip Hop Artist
| 
|-
| The Blueprint 3
| Favorite Rap/Hip Hop Album
| 
|-
| style="text-align:center;"| 2011
| Watch The Throne  (with Kanye West) 
| Favorite Rap/Hip-Hop Album
|
|-
| style="text-align:center;" rowspan="2"|2013
| Jay-Z
| Favorite Rap/Hip-Hop Artist
| 
|-
| Magna Carta... Holy Grail
| Favorite Rap/Hip-Hop Album
| 
|-
| style="text-align:center;"|2018
|  On the Run II Tour  
| Tour of the Year
| 
|-

ASCAP Music Awards

ASCAP Pop Music Awards

|-
| style="text-align:center;"|2004
|rowspan="1"|Crazy in Love 
|rowspan="7"| Most Performed Song
| 
|-
|rowspan="2"|2005
|rowspan="1"| "Baby Boy"
| 
|-
|rowspan="1"| "Dirt Off Your Shoulder"
| 
|-
|rowspan="1"|2008
|rowspan="1"| "Umbrella"
| 
|-
| rowspan="2" style="text-align:center;"|2010
|rowspan="1"|Run This Town 
| 
|-
|rowspan="1"|Empire State of Mind 
| 
|-
| style="text-align:center;"|2015
|rowspan="1"|Drunk in Love 
|

ASCAP Rhythm & Soul Music Awards 

|-
| rowspan="1"| 1999
| "Money Ain't A Thang"
| rowspan="1"| Award Winning R&B/Hip-Hop Songs
| 
|-
| rowspan="2"| 2004
| Jay-Z
| rowspan="1"| Golden Note Award
| 
|-
| "Crazy in Love" 
| rowspan="2"| Award Winning R&B/Hip-Hop Songs
| 
|-
| rowspan="2"| 2005
| rowspan="2"|"Dirt Off Your Shoulder"
| 
|-
|rowspan="1"| Award Winning Rap Songs
| 
|-
| rowspan="3"| 2006
| rowspan="1"|"Bring Em Out"
| rowspan="2"| Award Winning R&B/Hip-Hop Songs
| 
|-
| rowspan="1"|"I'm A Hustla"
| 
|-
| rowspan="1"|"Bring Em Out"
| rowspan="1"| Award Winning Rap Songs
| 
|-
| rowspan="1"| 2007
| rowspan="1"|"Enough Cryin"
| rowspan="1"| Award Winning R&B/Hip-Hop Songs
| 
|-
|rowspan="1"| 2010
| "Run This Town" 
|rowspan="2"| Award Winning Rap Songs
| 
|-
|rowspan="1"| 2011
| "Empire State of Mind
| 
|-
|rowspan="2"| 2012
| "Niggas In Paris" 
|rowspan="3"| Award Winning R&B/Hip-Hop Songs
| 
|-
| "Otis" 
| 
|-
|rowspan="2"|2013
| rowspan="2"|"Niggas In Paris" 
| 
|-
| rowspan="1"| Award Winning Rap Songs
| 
|-
|rowspan="5"|2014
| "Clique" 
|rowspan="4"| Award Winning R&B/Hip-Hop Songs
| 
|-
| "Holy Grail"
| 
|-
| "Tom Ford"
| 
|-
| "Suit & Tie"
| 
|-
| "Holy Grail"
|rowspan="1"| Top Rap Song
| 
|-
| rowspan="6" | 2015
| "Drunk in Love" 
| Top R&B/Hip-Hop Songs
| 
|-
| "Part II (On the Run)"
| rowspan="3"| Award Winning R&B/Hip-Hop Songs
| 
|-
| "The Worst"
| 
|-
| "Tom Ford"
| 
|-
| "Part II (On the Run)"
| rowspan="1"| Award Winning Rap Songs
| 
|-
| Jay-Z
| rowspan="1"| Songwriter of the Year
| 
|-
| rowspan="3" | 2017
| "I Got the Keys" 
| rowspan="2"| Award Winning R&B/Hip-Hop Songs
| 
|-
|rowspan="2"| "All the Way Up" 
| 
|-
|rowspan="1"| Award Winning Rap Songs
| 
|-
|rowspan="1"| 2018
| "Shining 
|rowspan="3"| Award Winning R&B/Hip-Hop Songs
| 
|-
|rowspan="1"| 2019
| "Apeshit"
| 
|-
|rowspan="1"| 2021
| Savage (Remix)
| 
|-
|}

BET Awards
The BET Awards are held annually by Black Entertainment Television. Jay-Z has won seven awards from thirty-five nominations.

|-
| rowspan="2"| 2001
| Jay-Z
| Best Male Hip Hop Artist
| 
|-
| I Just Wanna Luv U (Give It 2 Me)
| Viewer's Choice
| 
|-
| 2002
| rowspan="2"| Jay-Z
| rowspan="2"| Best Male Hip Hop Artist
| 
|-
| rowspan="2"| 2003
| 
|-
| 03 Bonnie & Clyde  (featuring Beyoncé) 
| Best Collaboration
| 
|-
| rowspan="4"| 2004
| Jay-Z
| Best Male Hip Hop Artist
| 
|-
| rowspan="3"| Crazy in Love (with Beyoncé)
| Video of the Year
| 
|-
| Viewer's Choice
| 
|-
| rowspan="3"| Best Collaboration
| 
|-
| rowspan="3"| 2007
| Upgrade U (with Beyoncé)
| 
|-
| Déjà Vu (with Beyoncé)
| 
|-
| rowspan="3"| Jay-Z
| rowspan="3"| Best Male Hip Hop Artist
| 
|-
| 2008
| 
|-
| rowspan="5"| 2010
| 
|-
| rowspan="3"| Empire State of Mind (featuring Alicia Keys) 
| Best Collaboration
| 
|-
| Viewer's Choice
| 
|-
| rowspan="2"| Video Of The Year
| 
|-
| Run This Town  (featuring Rihanna & Kanye West) 
| 
|-
| rowspan="5"| 2012
| The Throne  (Jay-Z & Kanye West) 
| Best Group
| 
|-
| rowspan="3"| Otis (with Kanye West feat. Otis Redding)
| Best Collaboration
| 
|-
| Viewer's Choice
| 
|-
| rowspan="2"|Video of the Year
| 
|-
| Niggas in Paris (with Kanye West)
| 
|-
| rowspan="3"|2013
| rowspan="3"|Suit & Tie (feat. Justin Timberlake)
| Video of the Year
| 
|-
| Best Collaboration
| 
|-
| Viewer's Choice
| 
|-
| rowspan="5"|2014
| Holy Grail (feat. Justin Timberlake)
| rowspan="2"|Best Collaboration
| 
|-
| rowspan="3"|Drunk in Love (feat. Beyoncé)
| 
|-
| Viewer's Choice
| 
|-
| Video of the Year
| 
|-
| Jay-Z
| Best Male Hip Hop Artist
| 
|-
| 2017
| Shining (feat. Beyoncé & DJ Khaled)
| rowspan="1"|Best Collaboration
| 
|-
| rowspan="3"|2018
| 4:44
| rowspan="1"|Album of the Year
| 
|-
| Top Off (feat. Beyoncé, Future, DJ Khaled)
| rowspan="1"|Best Collaboration
| 
|-
| Jay-Z
| Best Male Hip Hop Artist
| 
|-

BET Hip Hop Awards 

The BET Hip Hop Awards were established in 2006 by the Black Entertainment Television network to celebrate hip-hop performers, producers and music video directors.

Billboard Music Awards
The Billboard Music Awards are an annual awards show from Billboard. Jay-Z received six awards.

|-
|1998
|Jay-Z
|R&B Albums Artist of the Year
|
|-
|rowspan="3"|1999
|rowspan="3"|Jay-Z
|Male Artist of the Year
|
|-
|Rap Artist of the Year
|
|-
|R&B/Hip-Hop Artist of the Year
|
|-
|rowspan="1"|2001
|rowspan="1"|Fiesta
|Top R&B/hip-hop single of the year
|
|-
|rowspan="4"|2002
|rowspan="2"|Jay-Z
|Top Male R&B/Hip-Hop Artist
|
|-
|R&B/Hip-Hop Albums Artist of the Year
|
|-
|rowspan="2"|The Blueprint
|Rap Album of the Year
|
|-
|R&B/Hip-Hop Album of the Year
|
|-
|2003
|Jay-Z
|R&B/Hip-Hop Artist of the Year
|
|-
|rowspan="6"|2004
|rowspan="4"|Jay-Z
|Rap Artist of the Year
|
|-
|R&B/Hip-Hop Albums Artist of the Year
|
|-
|R&B/Hip-Hop Singles Artist of the Year
|
|-
|R&B/Hip-Hop Male Artist of the Year
|
|-
|rowspan="2"|The Black Album
|R&B/Hip-Hop Album of the Year
|
|-
|Rap Album of the Year
|
|-
|2011
|Watch the Throne
|Top Rap Album
|
|-
|rowspan="5"|2014
|rowspan="1"|Jay-Z
|Top Rap Artist
|
|-
|rowspan="1"|Magna Carta Holy Grail
|Top Rap Album
|
|-
|rowspan="1"|"Holy Grail"  (with Justin Timberlake) 
|Top Rap Song
|
|-
|rowspan="1"|"Drunk in Love"  (with Beyoncé) 
|rowspan="2"|Top R&B Song
|
|-
|"Suit & Tie"  (with Justin Timberlake) 
|
|-
|rowspan="1"|2018
|rowspan="1"|Jay-Z
|Top Rap Tour
|
|-
| rowspan="3" | 2019
| rowspan="3"| The Carters
| Top Touring Artist
| 
|-
| Top R&B Tour
| 
|-
| Top Rap Tour
|

Billboard Touring Awards
The Billboard Touring Awards are an annual awards show from Billboard. Jay-Z received three nomination.

|-
|rowspan="2"| 2013
|rowspan="1"|Jay-Z & Justin Timberlake – "Legends Of Summer" (with DJ Cassidy)
|Top Package
|
|-
|rowspan="1"|Jay-Z
|Fans' Choice Awards
|
|-
|rowspan="3"| 2018
|rowspan="3"|Jay-Z & Beyoncé - "On The Run II Tour"
|Top World Tour
|
|-
|Top US Tour
|
|-
|Top Draw
|
|-

Black Music & Entertainment Walk of Fame

!
|-
| 2021
| Jay-Z
| Inductee
| 
| align="center"|
|}

Black Reel Awards
The  Black Reel Awards annually recognize and celebrate the achievements of black people in feature, independent and television films. Jay-Z received two nominations.

|-
| rowspan="1"| 2011
| "Run This Town"  (featuring Rihanna & Kanye West) 
| rowspan="4"| Best Original or Adapted Song
| 
|-
| rowspan="1"| 2013
|"No Church in the Wild"  (featuring Frank Ocean & Kanye West) 
| 
|-
| rowspan="2"| 2022
|"Guns Go Bang"  (featuring Kid Cudi and Jeymes Samuel) 
| 
|-
|"The Harder They Fall"  (featuring Koffee and Jeymes Samuel) 
| 
|-

Brit Awards
The Brit Awards are held annually by the British Phonographic Industry. Jay-Z has won two award from five nominations.

|-
|2009
|rowspan="2"|Jay-Z
|rowspan="2"|International Male Solo Artist
|
|-
|rowspan="2"|2010
|
|-
|The Blueprint 3
|International Album
|
|-
|2012
|The Throne (Jay-Z and Kanye West)
|rowspan="2"|International Group
|
|-
|2019
|The Carters (Beyoncé and Jay-Z)
|

Cannes Lions International Festival of Creativity

Ciclope Festival Awards

Clio Awards

|-
|rowspan="4"|2018
| rowspan="3"|"The Story of O.J."
| rowspan="1"| Music Videos
|
|-
| rowspan="1"| Other
|
|-
| rowspan="1"| Animation
|
|-
| rowspan="1"|"Apeshit"
| rowspan="1"| Music Videos
|
|-

Critics' Choice Movie Awards
The  Critics' Choice Movie Awards is an awards show presented annually by the American-Canadian Critics Choice Association to honor the finest in cinematic achievement.

|-
| rowspan="1"| 2022
|"Guns Go Bang"  (featuring Kid Cudi and Jeymes Samuel) 
|Best Song
| 
|-

D&AD Awards
D&AD Awards brings together creative work, inspiring projects from around the globe for anyone part of the design and advertising industry.

|-
|rowspan="1"|2014
| rowspan="1"|"Jay Z Magna Carta Holy Grail App"
| rowspan="1"| Wood Pencil for Digital & Mobile
|
|-
|rowspan="3"|2018
| rowspan="2"|"The Story of O.J."
| rowspan="1"| Animation for Music Videos
|
|-
| rowspan="2"| Music Videos
|
|-
| rowspan="1"|"Smile"
|
|-

Dieline Awards
The Dieline Awards recognizes the best in consumer product packaging design worldwide, celebrating innovation and honouring excellence in packaging design.

!
|-
| 2012
| Watch the Throne
| Dieline Package Design Award
| 
| style="text-align:center;"|
|}

Emmy Awards

Primetime Emmy Awards

!
|-
| 2015
| On the Run Tour: Beyoncé and Jay-Z
| Outstanding Special Class Program
| 
| style="text-align:center;"|
|-
| 2021
| The Pepsi Super Bowl LV Halftime Show Starring The Weeknd
| rowspan="2"| Outstanding Variety Special (Live)
| 
| style="text-align:center;" rowspan="2"|
|-
| 2022
| The Pepsi Super Bowl LVI Halftime Show Starring Dr. Dre, Snoop Dogg, Mary J. Blige, Eminem, Kendrick Lamar and 50 Cent
| 
|}

Sports Emmy Awards

!
|-
| style="text-align:center;"| 2011
| "Run This Town (Live at Super Bowl XLIV)"
| Outstanding Music Composition/Direction/Lyrics
| 
| style="text-align:center;"|
|}

Esky Music Awards
The Esky Music Awards were awarded annually by Esquire magazine.

|-
| rowspan="1"| 2008
| rowspan="1"| Jay-Z
| Hall of Fame
| 
|}

GAFFA Awards (Sweden)
Delivered since 2010, the GAFFA Awards (Swedish: GAFFA Priset) are a Swedish award that rewards popular music awarded by the magazine of the same name.

!
|-
| 2013
| Magna Carta Holy Grail
| Best Foreign Album
| 
| style="text-align:center;" |
|-
|}

GLAAD Media Awards
The GLAAD Media Awards are held annually by the Gay and Lesbian Alliance Against Defamation to recognise and honor members or supporters of the LGBT community and the issues that affect them. Jay-Z has won 2 awards.

|-
| 2018
| "Smile" featuring Gloria Carter
| Special Recognition Award
| 
|-
| 2019
| Beyoncé and Jay-Z
| Vanguard Award
| 
|}

GQ Awards

GQ Fashion Awards

|-
| 2020
| rowspan="1"| Jay-Z on vacay
| rowspan="1"| Biggest Fit Of The Year
| 
|}

GQ Men of the Year Awards
The GQ Men of the Year Awards are given annually by British men's magazine GQ, celebrating progressive thinkers and people who have excelled in their field. Jay-Z has received one award.

|-
| 2011
| Jay-Z
| Man of the Year
| 
|}

GQ Most Stylish Man of the Year Awards

|-
| 2012
| rowspan="2"| Jay-Z
| rowspan="2"| Most Stylish Men
| 
|-
| 2015
| 
|}

Grammy Awards
The Grammy Awards are held annually by the National Academy of Recording Arts and Sciences. Jay-Z has won 24 awards from 88 nominations.

!Ref.
|-
| rowspan="3" | 1999
| Vol. 2... Hard Knock Life
| rowspan="1" | Best Rap Album
| 
| rowspan="3" |
|-
| "Hard Knock Life (Ghetto Anthem)"
| Best Rap Solo Performance
| 
|-
| "Money Ain't a Thang"  (with Jermaine Dupri) 
| rowspan="2" | Best Rap Performance by a Duo or a Group
| 
|-
| rowspan="2" | 2001
| "Big Pimpin'"  (featuring UGK) 
| 
|rowspan="2" |
|-
| Vol. 3... Life and Times of S. Carter
| rowspan="2" | Best Rap Album
| 
|-
| rowspan="3" | 2002
| The Blueprint
| 
| rowspan="3" |
|-
| "Izzo (H.O.V.A.)"
| Best Rap Solo Performance
| 
|-
| "Change the Game"  (featuring Memphis Bleek, Beanie Sigel and Static Major) 
| rowspan="1" | Best Rap Performance by a Duo or a Group
| 
|-
| 2003
| "Song Cry"
| Best Male Rap Solo Performance
| 
|
|-
| rowspan="6" | 2004
| The Blueprint²: The Gift & The Curse
| rowspan="1" | Best Rap Album
| 
| rowspan="6" |
|-
| rowspan="3" | "Crazy in Love" (with Beyoncé) 
| Record of the Year
| 
|-
| Best R&B Song
| 
|-
| rowspan="2"|Best Rap/Sung Collaboration
| 
|-
| "Frontin'"  (with Pharrell) 
| 
|-
| "Excuse Me Miss"  (featuring Pharrell) 
| rowspan="2" |Best Rap Song
| 
|-
| rowspan="3" | 2005
| rowspan="2" | "99 Problems"
| 
| rowspan="3" |
|-
| Best Rap Solo Performance
| 
|-
| The Black Album
| rowspan="1" | Best Rap Album
| 
|-
| 2006
| "Numb/Encore"  (with Linkin Park) 
| rowspan="2" |Best Rap/Sung Collaboration
| 
|
|-
| rowspan="2" | 2007
| rowspan="2" | "Déjà Vu"  (with Beyoncé) 
| 
| rowspan="2" |
|-
| Best R&B Song
| 
|-
| rowspan="5" | 2008
| "Show Me What You Got"
| Best Rap Solo Performance
| 
| rowspan="5" |
|-
| rowspan="3" | "Umbrella"  (with Rihanna) 
| Record of the Year
| 
|-
| Song of the Year
| 
|-
| Best Rap/Sung Collaboration
| 
|-
| Kingdom Come
| rowspan="2" | Best Rap Album
| 
|-
| rowspan="6" | 2009
| American Gangster
| 
| rowspan="6" |
|-
| "Roc Boys (And the Winner Is)..."
| Best Rap Solo Performance
| 
|-
|Tha Carter III (as featured artist)
|Album of the Year
|
|-
| rowspan="2" | "Swagga Like Us"  (with T.I., Kanye West and Lil Wayne) 
| Best Rap Song
| 
|-
| rowspan="3" | Best Rap Performance by a Duo or a Group
| 
|-
| "Mr. Carter"  (with Lil Wayne) 
| 
|-
| rowspan="5" | 2010
| "Money Goes, Honey Stay"  (with Fabolous) 
| 
| rowspan="5" |
|-
| rowspan="2"|"D.O.A. (Death of Auto-Tune)"
| Best Rap Solo Performance
| 
|-
| rowspan="2" | Best Rap Song
| 
|-
| rowspan="2"|"Run This Town"  (featuring Rihanna and Kanye West) 
| 
|-
| rowspan="2" |Best Rap/Sung Collaboration
| 
|-
| rowspan="6" | 2011
| rowspan="3" | "Empire State of Mind"  (featuring Alicia Keys) 
| 
| rowspan="6" |
|-
| Record of the Year
| 
|-
| rowspan="2" | Best Rap Song
| 
|-
| rowspan="2" | "On to the Next One"  (featuring Swizz Beatz) 
| 
|-
| Best Rap Performance by a Duo or a Group
| 
|-
| The Blueprint 3
| rowspan="2" | Best Rap Album
| 
|-
| rowspan="3" | 2012
| Watch The Throne  (with Kanye West) 
| 
| rowspan="3" |
|-
| rowspan="2" |"Otis"  (with Kanye West) 
| Best Rap Song
| 
|-
| rowspan="3"|Best Rap Performance
| 
|-
|rowspan="6"|2013
|"I Do" (with Young Jeezy & André 3000)
|
|rowspan="6"|
|-
|rowspan="2"|"Niggas in Paris" (with Kanye West)
|
|-
|Best Rap Song
|
|-
|rowspan="2"|"No Church in the Wild" (with Kanye West, Frank Ocean & The-Dream)
|Best Short Form Music Video
|
|-
|rowspan="4"|Best Rap/Sung Collaboration
|
|-
|"Talk That Talk" (with Rihanna)
|
|-
|rowspan="9"|2014
|"Part II (On the Run)" (featuring Beyoncé)
|
|rowspan="9"|
|-
|rowspan="2"|"Holy Grail" (featuring Justin Timberlake)
|
|-
|Best Rap Song
|
|-
|Magna Carta Holy Grail
|Best Rap Album
|
|-
|"Tom Ford"
|Best Rap Performance
|
|-
|rowspan="2"|"Suit & Tie" (with Justin Timberlake)
|Best Pop Duo/Group Performance
|
|-
|rowspan="2"|Best Music Video
|
|-
|"Picasso Baby: A Performance Art Film"
|
|-
|Good Kid, M.A.A.D City (as featured artist)
|rowspan="2"|Album of the Year
|
|-
|rowspan="4"|2015
|Beyoncé (as featured artist)
|
|-
|rowspan="2"|"Drunk in Love" (with Beyoncé)
|Best R&B Performance
|
|-
|Best R&B Song
|
|-
|On the Run Tour: Beyoncé and Jay-Z
|Best Music Film
|
|-
| 2017
| "Pop Style" (with Drake & Kanye West)
|Best Rap Performance
| 
|-
|rowspan="8"|2018
|rowspan="2"|4:44
|Album of the Year
|
|-
|Best Rap Album
|
|-
|rowspan="3"|"The Story of O.J."
|Record of the Year
|
|-
|Best Rap Song
|
|-
|Best Music Video
|
|-
|rowspan="2"|"4:44"
|Song of the Year
|
|-
|Best Rap Performance
|
|-
|"Family Feud" (feat. Beyoncé)
|Best Rap/Sung Performance
|
|-
| rowspan="3" | 2019
| "Summer" (with Beyoncé as The Carters)
|Best R&B Performance
|
|-
|"Apeshit" (with Beyonce as The Carters)
|Best Music Video
|
|-
|Everything Is Love (with Beyoncé as The Carters)
|Best Urban Contemporary Album
|
|-
| rowspan="3" | 2021
| rowspan="2" | "Black Parade" (as songwriter)
|Song of the Year
|
| rowspan="3" |
|-
|Best R&B Song
|
|-
|"Savage" (as songwriter)
| rowspan="3"| Best Rap Song
|
|-
| rowspan="3" | 2022
|"Bath Salts" (DMX featuring Jay-Z and Nas)
|
| rowspan="3" |N/A
|-
|"Jail" (Kanye West featuring Jay-Z)
|
|-
| Donda (as featured artist and songwriter)
|rowspan="2"|Album of the Year
|
|-
| rowspan="5" | 2023
|Renaissance (as a songwriter)
|
| rowspan="5" |N/A
|-
|"Break My Soul" (as a songwriter)
|rowspan="2"|Song of the Year
|
|-
|rowspan="3"|"God Did" (with DJ Khaled, Rick Ross, Lil Wayne, John Legend and Fridayy)
|
|-
|Best Rap Performance
|
|-
|Best Rap Song
|

Non-competitive awards

!Ref.
|-
| rowspan="1" | 2018
| Jay-Z
| rowspan="1" |Salute to Industry Icons Award
| 
| rowspan="1" |
|-

Guys' Choice Award

|-
| rowspan="1"|2007
| Jay-Z
| Sickest Rhymes
| 
|-

HipHopDX Awards 
The HipHopDX Awards are an annual year-end awards given by online Hip-Hop magazine HipHopDX.

|-
| rowspan="2"| 2010
| "Jay-Z & Eminem: Home and Home"
| Tour/Concert of the Year
| 
|-
| "Kanye West f. Rick Ross, Jay-Z, Nicki Minaj & Bon Iver – “Monster”"
| Collaboration of the Year
| 
|-
| rowspan="1"| 2011
| "Watch the Throne Tour"
| Tour of the Year
| 
|-
| rowspan="1"| 2013
| "Jay-Z and Dame Dash"
| Instagram of the Year
| 
|-
| rowspan="1"| 2017
| "Jay-Z"
| Comeback of the Year
| 
|-
|}

Hip-Hop Summit Action Network (HSAN) Action Award
HSAN is the world's largest non-profit, non-partisan national coalition of Hip-Hop artists, entertainment industry leaders, education advocates, civil rights proponents, and youth leaders united in the belief that Hip-Hop is an enormously influential agent for social change which must be responsibly and proactively utilized to fight the war on poverty and injustice.

Hollywood Music in Media Awards

|-
| 2021
| "Guns Go Bang" (with Kid Cudi and Jeymes Samuel)
| Best Original Song in a Feature Film
| 
|-

IFPI Hong Kong Top Sales Music Awards

|-
| 2005 || Collision Course|| Top 10 Best Selling Foreign Albums || 
|-

iHeartRadio Music Awards

IIE Gala

International Dance Music Awards
The International Dance Music Awards were established in 1985. It is a part of the Winter Music Conference, a weeklong electronic music event held annually. Jay Z has received one award from one nomination.

Iowa Film Critics Awards

J-Wave Tokio Awards
Also known as McDonald's Tokio Hot 100, is the official music chart program of J-Wave and also the flagship program of the Japan FM League's Hot 100 music chart series. Tokio Hot 100 award was started up in 1995 as a reward for most outstanding songs under the name J-Wave Awards, and individual performers since 1997.

London International Awards
The London International Awards , or LIA (formerly known as London International Advertising Awards, LIAA), are a worldwide awards annually honoring "pioneers, and embodiments of excellence" in advertising, digital media, production, design, music & sound and branded entertainment. It was the first truly international advertising award of its kind to acknowledge all media and methods from all over the world to be judged by a diverse global jury.

Mobo Awards

|-
|rowspan="3" style="text-align:center;"|1999
|rowspan="2"| Jay-Z
|rowspan="1"|Best International Act
| 
|-
|rowspan="1"|Best International Hip-Hop Act
| 
|-
|rowspan="1"| Hard Knock Life (Ghetto Anthem)
|rowspan="1"|Best International Single
| 
|-
|rowspan="3" style="text-align:center;"|2003
|rowspan="1"| Jay-Z
|rowspan="1"|Best Hip-Hop
| 
|-
|rowspan="2"|"Crazy In Love" with Beyoncé
|rowspan="1"| Best Song
| 
|-
|rowspan="1"| Best Video
| 
|-
|rowspan="3" style="text-align:center;"|2004
|rowspan="1"| Jay-Z
|rowspan="1"|Best Hip-Hop
| 
|-
|rowspan="1"|The Black Album
|rowspan="1"|Best Album
| 
|-
|rowspan="1"|"99 Problems"
|rowspan="1"|Best Video
| 
|-
|rowspan="3" style="text-align:center;"|2006
|rowspan="1"| Jay-Z
|rowspan="1"|Best International Male Artist
| 
|-
|rowspan="2"| "Déjà Vu" with Beyoncé
|rowspan="1"| Best Song
| 
|-
|rowspan="2"| Best Video
| 
|-
|rowspan="1" style="text-align:center;"|2007
|rowspan="1"|"Umbrella" with Rihanna
| 
|-
|rowspan="1" style="text-align:center;"|2008
|rowspan="5"|Jay-Z
|rowspan="1"|Best Hip-Hop
| 
|-
|rowspan="1" style="text-align:center;"|2009
|rowspan="4"|Best International Act
| 
|-
|rowspan="1" style="text-align:center;"|2010
| 
|-
|rowspan="1" style="text-align:center;"|2013
| 
|-
|rowspan="1" style="text-align:center;"|2017
|

MTV Awards

MTV Europe Music Awards

|-
|rowspan="2"| 2003
| "Crazy in Love (Beyoncé Knowles song)
| Best Song
| 
|-
| Jay-Z
| Best Hip-Hop
| 
|-
|rowspan="3"| 2004
| "99 Problems"
| Best Video
| 
|-
|rowspan="2"| Jay-Z
| Best Male
| 
|-
| Best Hip-Hop
| 
|-
| 2007
| "Umbrella" with Rihanna
| Most Addictive Track
| 
|-
|rowspan="2"| 2009
|rowspan="2"| Jay-Z
| Best Male
| 
|-
| Best Urban
| 
|-
| 2011
|rowspan="3"| Jay-Z & Kanye West
| Best Hip-Hop
| 
|-
|rowspan="2"|2012
|Best Hip-Hop
|
|-
| Best Live
|
|-
|}

MTV Video Music Awards

|-
|rowspan="3"|
|rowspan="3"|"Can I Get A..." (with Ja Rule and Amil)
|Best Rap Video
|
|-
|Best Video from a Film
|
|-
|Viewer's Choice Award
|
|-
|
|"Big Pimpin'" (with UGK)
|Best Rap Video
|
|-
|
|"I Just Wanna Love U (Give It 2 Me)"
|Best Hip-Hop Video
|
|-
|rowspan="4"|
|"'03 Bonnie & Clyde" (with Beyoncé)
|Best Hip-Hop Video
|
|-
|rowspan="3"|"Crazy in Love" (with Beyoncé)
|Best Female Video
|
|-
|Best R&B Video
|
|-
|Best Choreography
|
|-
|rowspan="6"|
|rowspan="6"|"99 Problems"
|Video of the Year
|
|-
|Best Male Video
|
|-
|Best Rap Video
|
|-
|Best Direction in a Video
|
|-
|Best Editing in a Video
|
|-
|Best Cinematography in a Video
|
|-
|rowspan="3"|
|rowspan="2"|Umbrella
|Video of the Year
|
|-
|Monster Single of the Year
|
|-
|Jay-Z
|Quadruple Threat of the Year
|
|-
|rowspan="2"|
|rowspan="2"|"D.O.A. (Death of Auto-Tune)"
|Best Male Video
|
|-
|Best Hip-Hop Video
|
|-
|rowspan="4"|
|"On to the Next One" (featuring Swizz Beatz)
|Best Hip-Hop Video
|
|-
|rowspan="3"|"Empire State of Mind" (with Alicia Keys)
|Best Collaboration
|
|-
|Best Direction
|
|-
|Best Cinematography
|
|-
|rowspan="3"|
|rowspan="2"|"Niggas in Paris" (with Kanye West)
|Best Hip-Hop Video
|
|-
|Best Editing
|
|-
|"Otis" (with Kanye West)
|Best Direction
|
|-
|rowspan="2"|
|rowspan="2"|"Drunk in Love" (with Beyoncé)
| Video of the Year
| 
|-
|Best Collaboration
|
|-
|rowspan="8" | 2018
|rowspan="8" |"Apeshit"
| Video of the Year
| 
|-
| Best Collaboration
| 
|-
| Best Hip-Hop Video
| 
|-
| Best Cinematography in a Video
| 
|-
| Best Editing in a Video
| 
|-
| Best Direction in a Video
| 
|-
| Best Choreography in a Video
| 
|-
| Best Art Direction
| 
|-
|}

MTV Video Music Awards Japan

|-
|rowspan="3"| 2002
|rowspan="3"|Jay-Z
| Best Hip-Hop Artist
|
|-
| Best Live Performance
|
|-
| Inspiration Award International
|
|-
|rowspan="4"| 2004
| "Frontin'" Pharrell featuring Jay-Z
| Best Male Video
|
|-
| "Change Clothes"  Jay-Z featuring Pharrell
| Best Hip-Hop Video
|
|-
|rowspan="2"| "Crazy In Love" Beyoncé featuring Jay-Z
| Best Female Video
|
|-
| Best Collaboration
|
|-
| 2005
| "Numb/Encore" with Linkin Park
| Best Collaboration
|
|-
|rowspan="1"| 2007
| "Show Me What You Got"
| Best Hip-Hop Video
|
|-
|rowspan="1"| 2008
| "Umbrella" Rihanna featuring Jay-Z
| Video Of The Year
|
|-
| rowspan="2" align="center"| 2014
| rowspan="2"| "Drunk in Love" Beyoncé featuring Jay-Z
| Best Female Video
| 
|-
| Best R&B Video
|

MTV Movie & TV Awards 

|-
|rowspan="1"| 1999
|rowspan="1"|"Can I Get A..." (from Rush Hour)
| Best Song from a Movie
|
|-
|rowspan="1"| 2018
|rowspan="1"|Jay-Z's Footnotes for 4:44
| Best Music Documentary
|
|-

MTV TRL Awards 

|-
|rowspan="1"| 2004
| Jay-Z
| Retirement Award
|

MuchMusic Video Awards
The iHeartRadio Much Music Video Awards is an annual awards ceremony presented by the Canadian music video channel Much. Jay Z has won two awards from nine nominations.

 At the 2018 iHeartRadio Much Music Video Awards, The Carters (composed by Beyoncé and Jay Z) was nominated for one award (Best Hip Hop Artist or Group ) and three awards for "Apeshit".

Music Video Production Awards

Music Vision CADS Award
Honors given to the most outstanding promo talents for the year.

NAACP Image Awards

|-
|rowspan="2"|2004
|rowspan="2"|"Crazy in Love" (with Beyoncé)
|rowspan="1"|Outstanding Song
|
|-
|rowspan="1"|Outstanding Music Video
|
|-
|rowspan="2"|2006
|rowspan="1"|Jay-Z
|rowspan="1"|Outstanding Male Artist
|
|-
|rowspan="1"|"Show Me What You Got"
|rowspan="1"|Outstanding Music Video
|
|-
|rowspan="1"|2009
|rowspan="1"|"Umbrella" (with Rihanna)
|rowspan="1"|Outstanding Song
|
|-
|rowspan="5"|2010
|rowspan="1"|Jay-Z
|rowspan="1"|Outstanding Male Artist
|
|-
|rowspan="1"|"Run This Town" (with Rihanna & Kanye West)
|rowspan="2"|Outstanding Duo, Group or Collaboration
|
|-
|rowspan="2"|"Empire State of Mind" (with Alicia Keys)
|
|-
|rowspan="1"|Outstanding Song
|
|-
|rowspan="1"|The Blueprint 3
|rowspan="1"|Outstanding Album
|
|-
|rowspan="1"|2011
|rowspan="1"|Jay-Z
|rowspan="1"|Outstanding Male Artist
|
|-
|rowspan="1"|2014
|rowspan="1"|"Suit & Tie" (with Justin Timberlake)
|rowspan="1"|Outstanding Duo, Group or Collaboration
|
|-
|rowspan="5"|2017
|rowspan="2"|Jay-Z
|rowspan="1"| Entertainer of the Year
|
|-
| Outstanding Male Artist
| 
|-
|rowspan="2"|4:44
|rowspan="1"| Outstanding Music Video
|
|-
|rowspan="1"| Outstanding Album
|
|-
|rowspan="1"|"The Story of O.J."
|rowspan="1"| Outstanding Song
|
|-
|rowspan="1"|2019
|rowspan="1"|Jay-Z
|rowspan="1"| President's Award
|
|-
|rowspan="1"|2022
|rowspan="1"|The Harder They Fall Soundtrack
|rowspan="1"| Outstanding Soundtrack/Compilation Album
|
|-

National Recording Registry

|-
|2019
| “The Blueprint”
| Inducted
|

New York Awards

|-
|1999
| Jay-Z
| Music
|

New York Police & Fire Widows’ & Children’s Benefit Fund

|-
|2010
| Jay-Z
| Honoree
|

Nickelodeon Kids' Choice Awards
The Kids' Choice Awards are held annually by Nickelodeon. Jay-Z has won one award from three nominations.

|-
|rowspan="1" align="center"|2004
| "Crazy in Love" 
| Favorite Song
| 
|-
|2010
|rowspan="2"|Jay-Z
|rowspan="2"|Favorite Male Singer
|
|-
|2011
|
|-

NME Awards
The NME Awards are held annually by New Musical Express. Jay-Z has received three nominations.

|-
|2010
|Jay-Z at Alexandra Palace
|Best Live Event
|
|-
|2011
|Decoded
|Best Book
|
|-
|2012
|Watch The Throne
|Best Album Artwork
|

One Show Awards
The One Club is an American non-profit organization that recognizes and promotes excellence in advertising. The One Club produces four annual award competitions: One Show, One Show Design, One Show Interactive and One Show Entertainment.

Peabody Award

|-
| 2018
| Time: The Kalief Browder Story
| Honoree
|

People's Choice Awards
The People's Choice Awards are held annually by CBS. Jay-Z has won one award from four nominations.

|-
|rowspan="2"|2010
|"Run This Town"  (with Rihanna & Kanye West) 
|Favorite Music Collaboration
|
|-
|rowspan="4"|Jay-Z
|Favorite Hip-Hop Artist
|
|-
|2012
|Favorite Hip-Hop Artist
|
|-
|2013
|Favorite Hip-Hop Artist
|
|-
|2014
|Favorite Hip-Hop Artist
|
|-
|2018
|"On the Run II Tour" (with Beyoncé)
|Concert Tour of the Year
|
|-

Pollstar Awards
The Pollstar Awards is an annual award ceremony to honor artists and professionals in the concert industry.

|-
|rowspan="1"|2015
|On the Run Tour
|Major Tour of the Year
|
|-
|rowspan="2"|2018
|rowspan="2"| On The Run II Tour
|Best Hip-Hop/R&B
|
|-
|Major Tour of the Year
|
|}

Pop Awards
The Pop Awards are presented annually by Pop Magazine, honoring the best in popular music. Jay-Z has won one with Beyoncé.

|-
| 2018
| Jay-Z
| Artist Of The Year Award
| 
|-
| 2019
| The Carters
| Artist Of The Year Award
| 
|-

Porin Awards
The Porin Award is a Croatian music award founded by the Croatian Phonographic Association, Croatian Musicians Union, Croatian Radiotelevision and Croatian Composers' Society.

Radio Music Award
The Radio Music Awards was an annual U.S. award show that honored the year's most successful songs on mainstream radio. Nominations were based on the amount of airplay recording artists receive on radio stations in various formats using chart information compiled by Mediabase.

!
|-
|1999
| Can I Get A...
| Best Car Jam
| 
| align="center"|
|-
|2000
| Jay-Z
| Artist of the Year: Hip Hop/Rhythmic
| 
| align="center"|
|}

Recording Academy Honors
The Recording Academy Honors Awards were established to celebrate outstanding individuals whose work embodies excellence and integrity and who have improved the environment for the creative community. Jay-Z has received one award.

!
|-
| 2005
| Jay-Z
| New York Chapter's The Recording Academy Honors
| 
| align="center"|
|}

Rock & Roll Hall of Fame

!
|-
| 2021
| Jay-Z
| Inductee
| 
| align="center"|
|}

RTHK International Pop Poll Awards
The RTHK International Pop Poll Awards are sponsored by RTHK.

Smash Hits Awards
The Smash Hits Awards was an awards ceremony voted by readers of the Smash Hits magazine, which ran from 1988 until the closure of the magazine in 2006.

SoCal Journalism Awards

|-
| 2017
| Jay-Z and Harvey Weinstein for Time: The Kalief Browder Story
| Truthteller Award
|

Songwriters Hall of Fame
The Songwriters Hall of Fame (SHOF) was founded in 1969 by songwriter Johnny Mercer and music publisher/songwriter Abe Olman and publisher/executive Howie Richmond to honor those whose work represents and maintains the heritage and legacy of a spectrum of the most beloved songs from the world's popular music songbook. Jay-Z was inducted in 2017 becoming the first rapper to be inducted in the awards' history.

|-
| 2018
| Jay-Z
| Inductee
| 
|-

Soul Train Awards

|-
| rowspan="1"|2001
| Jay-Z
| Sammy Davis Jr. Award for Entertainer of the Year
| 
|-
| rowspan="1"|2002
| "The Blueprint"
| R&B/Soul or Rap Album of the Year
| 
|-
| rowspan="1"|2005
| "99 Problems"
| rowspan="2"|Best R&B/Soul or Rap Music Video
| 
|-
| rowspan="1"|2007
| "Show Me What You Got"
| 
|-

Source Awards

|-
| rowspan="1"|2001
| rowspan="2"|Jay-Z
| Artist of the Year - Solo
| 
|-
| rowspan="1"|2004
| Lyricist of the Year
| 
|-

Space Shower Music Video Awards
The Coca-Cola presents SPACE SHOWER Music Video Awards are an annual set of music awards sponsored by Space Shower TV. The prizes have been awarded since 1996.

Sucker Free Awards
The Sucker Free Awards was a 2011 awards ceremony that honoured the best of the year in hip-hop, throughout seven different categories. West received two awards from three nominations.

!
|-
| rowspan="3"| 2011
|Jay-Z & Kanye West
| The Artist That Ran 2011
| 
| rowspan="3" align="center"|
|-
| Watch The Throne
| Best Album of the Year
| 
|-
| "Niggas In Paris" (with Kanye West)
|  Song of the Year
| 
|}

Swiss Music Awards
The Swiss Music Awards are presented the Press Play Association in conjunction with Media Control Switzerland to national and international musicians in over ten categories.

|-
| rowspan="1"| 2008
|"Umbrella" 
| Best Song - International
| 
|-
| 2012
|"Watch the Throne" 
|rowspan="2"|  Best Album Urban - International
| 
|-
| rowspan="1"| 2014
|"Magna Carta…Holy Grail"
|

SXSW Awards

Teen Choice Awards

|-
|rowspan="2"|2003
|rowspan="2"|"Crazy in Love"
|Choice Music: Love Song
|
|-
|Choice Music: Summer Song
|
|-

Television Academy Honors
The Television Academy Honors celebrates programs—across numerous platforms and genres—that examine and portray complex issues and challenges facing our society with extraordinary impact. Jay-Z won one as one of the executive producer of the documentary, Rest in Power: The Trayvon Martin Story

|-
|2019
| Rest in Power: The Trayvon Martin Story
| Honoree
|
|-

The Gathering for Harry
In celebration of legendary singer, songwriter, activist and actor Harry Belafonte's 94th birthday. The Gatekeeper of Truth Award for his support to organizers on the frontlines during these political times and his inspiration to generations past & future.

The Observer UK

Ticketmaster Touring Milestone Award
Ticketmaster created Touring Milestone Award, recognizing excellence in total numbers of tickets sold from 17 of its clients. All the winners ended the year with more than 500,000 tickets moved.

Tony Awards
The Tony Awards are held annually by American Theatre Wing and The Broadway League. Jay-Z has received one nomination.

|-
|2010
|Fela!
|Best Musical
|
|-

UK Festival Awards

|-
|rowspan="1"|2008
|Jay-Z mocks Noel Gallagher with his rendition of Wonderwall at Glastonbury
|Most Memorable Moment
|
|-

UK Music Video Awards

|-
|rowspan="3"|2010
|rowspan="3"|"On To The Next One" with Swizz Beatz
|Best Telecine in a Video
|
|-
|Best Editing in a Video
|
|-
|rowspan="4"|Best Urban Video - International
|
|-
|rowspan="1"|2011
|rowspan="1"|"Otis" with Kanye West
|
|-
|rowspan="3"|2012
|rowspan="1"|"Ni**as In Paris" ft. Kanye West
|
|-
|rowspan="2"|"No Church In The Wild" with Kanye West
|
|-
|Best Telecine in a Video
|
|-
|rowspan="1"|2015
|"On the Run Tour" with Beyoncé
|Best Live Music Coverage
|
|-
|rowspan="4"|2017
|"Moonlight"
|Best Urban Video - International
|
|-
|rowspan="2"|"The Story of O.J."
|Vevo MUST SEE Award
|
|-
|Best Animation in a Video
|
|-
|rowspan="1"|"Bam" ft. Damian Marley
|Best Colour Grading in a Video
|
|-
|rowspan="1"|2021
|"Entrepreneur" ft. Pharrell Williams
|Best Hip Hop/Grime/Rap Video - International
|

United Nations Global Leadership Award

Urban Music Award

VH1 BIG Awards

VH1 Soul VIBE Awards

Webby Awards

Whudat Music Awards

Wild Writings Online Awards
The Wild Writings Online Awards is an award show organize to honor celebrities in Music, Television, Films and Fashion. Established in 2003, the award was defunct in 2005.

World Music Awards
The World Music Awards are held annually by the International Federation of the Phonographic Industry.

|-
| 2010
| Jay-Z
| Best Pop Act
| 
|-

XXL

|-
| 2001
| Jay-Z
| Man of the Year
| 
|-

Other honors
In 2006, Jay-Z journeyed to Nigeria as part of his activities in the service of the U.N. Water for Life project. While there, he was enstooled as the Sarkin Waka of Kwara – a chieftain of the Fula people – by Alhaji Ibrahim Kolapo Sulu Gambari, the Emir of the Ilorin Emirate.

References 

Jay-Z
Jay-Z